A  trade gallon is a unit of volume for standard plant containers in the horticultural industries.

Notably, 10 trade gallons equals 30 US quarts, which in turn equals 1.0 cubic foot, a common unit of measurement for soil.

Notes

Imperial units